Seckach is a village and a municipality in the district of Neckar-Odenwald-Kreis, in Baden-Württemberg, Germany.

Seckach may also refer to:

Seckach (Lauchert), a river of Baden-Württemberg, Germany, tributary of the Lauchert
Seckach (Jagst), a river of Baden-Württemberg, Germany, tributary of the Jagst
SC Klinge Seckach, a German women's football club based in Seckach